Aimen Dean is a former member of al-Qaeda. In 1998, he was recruited by the Secret Intelligence Service and became an MI6 spy.

Early life
Dean was born in Saudi Arabia. By the age of 12, he had memorised the Quran (thereby becoming a Hafiz). Following the death of his mother he sought solace in Sayyid Qutb's In the Shade of the Koran. He was part of an Islamic Awareness circle at Omar Bin Abdulaziz Mosque in Khobar, where one of the instructors was Yusef al-Ayeri. In 1989, his eldest brother Moheddin went to fight in Afghanistan for three months.  At 15, he travelled to Bosnia to participate in the Bosnian War with a friend from the circle Khaled Ali Hajj who had returned from fighting in Afghanistan.

In Bosnia, Dean was part of the Bosnian mujahideen Brigade who massacred over 200 prisoners by decapitation following the Battle for Vozuća.  He witnessed his friend Khaled saw off the head of a prisoner with a serrated hunting knife. Just before the end of the war he was recruited by Khalid Sheikh Mohammed who suggested that he go to Afghanistan and give him a contact in Peshawar, Pakistan.

Al-Qaeda
Following Bosnia, Dean was invited to Kandahar to swear allegiance to Osama bin Laden and join al-Qaeda.  In Afghanistan, he trained al-Qaeda recruits in the basics of Islamic theology, history and the essentials of religious practice. He was worried by the 1998 United States embassy bombings and asked Abdullah al-Mohaja for the religious justification.

He was pointed to a 13th-century Fatwa by Ibn Taymiyyah.  He researched the Fatwa which was about the Mongol invasion and their use of human shields when besieging cities; it was clear to him that this was no justification for killing civilian bystanders.  He believes the concept of Jihad has been changed by al-Qaeda, and its goal is to start a world war against the West.

Spying
Dean decided to leave al-Qaeda, going to Qatar on the pretext of his health with the intention to disappear. He was captured on arrival in Qatar by Qatari Intelligence, who gave him a choice of intelligence agency and he chose to work with MI6. MI6 then spent seven months debriefing him, after which he agreed to go back to Afghanistan as a spy.

Dean then spied on al-Qaeda for 8 years prior to being exposed by Washington. During this time, he travelled between Afghanistan and London on behalf of al-Qaeda allowing him to report to MI6. While in the UK, he acted as al-Qaeda's representative and had to be careful to preach and recruit within UK law.

Dean's cover was reportedly blown by Ron Suskind who, using CIA sources, disclosed his identity with details that could only be sourced to Dean in an excerpt of The One Percent Doctrine for Time.

Later career
After being exposed, Dean started a career as a speaker and security consultant.

Dean is the author of two books:
 The Eternal Bridge Over the River Innocence: A novel about the story of what happens to young bright and decent Muslims who come under radical influence.
 Nine Lives: My Time As MI6's Top Spy Inside al-Qaeda: biography of his life as a spy inside al-Qaeda

In August 2022, Dean claimed his five-year-old daughter's school, St George's School, Edinburgh, had discriminated against the family due to his past. Dean plans to leave the UK, where he was granted permanent residence, with his family to find a school for his children in the Middle East.

References

External links
Al-Qaida senior leader grants rare TV interview
The Eternal Bridge Over the River Innocence reviews

Al-Qaeda founders
Living people
Saudi Arabian expatriates in Afghanistan
Saudi Arabian al-Qaeda members
Saudi Arabian spies
Saudi Arabian expatriates in the United Kingdom
1978 births